SC Düdingen is a Swiss football club based in Düdingen, Canton Fribourg. They currently play in the Swiss 1. Liga, the third tier of Swiss football.

History

The club was formed in July 1924 by a group of young men at the Hotel Bahnhof in Düdingen. The first board of directors at the club consisted of the President Romain de Meyer, his vice-president Jules Sapin and Treasurer Louis Vuarnoz. The club did not immediately seek affiliation with the Swiss Football Association, they mostly played friendly matches. In 1974 the club gained their first promotion to the 2nd tier.

External links
Official website 
football.ch profile 
Soccerway profile 

Football clubs in Switzerland
Association football clubs established in 1924
1924 establishments in Switzerland